August Lenz (29 November 1910 – 5 December 1988) was a German international footballer.

In his first five appearances for the German national team he scored six goals in total, later his goalscoring tally dried up but he amassed creditable nine goals in 14 matches. He was also part of Germany's squad at the 1936 Summer Olympics.

References

External links
 
 
 
 

1910 births
1988 deaths
Association football forwards
German footballers
Olympic footballers of Germany
Germany international footballers
Footballers at the 1936 Summer Olympics
Borussia Dortmund players